The Cape Cod Mercury 15, also called the Mercury Sloop and just the Mercury, is an American trailerable sailboat and sailing dinghy, that was designed by Sparkman & Stephens and first built in 1940.

The design is sometimes confused with the unrelated Ernest Nunes 1939 Mercury 18 design.

Production
The design is built by Cape Cod Shipbuilding in the United States, and remained in production in 2020 after 80 years.

Design
The Mercury 15 is a recreational keelboat or dinghy, depending on the model, originally built of wood, since 1948 it has been constructed of fiberglass, with wood trim. It has a fractional sloop rig with aluminum spars. The hull has a spooned plumb stem, a plumb transom, a transom-hung rudder controlled by a tiller and a fixed fin keel or a retractable centerboard.

The design has accommodation for five people, but is normally sailing with a crew of two sailors.

A optional teak motor mount is available to allow use of an outboard motor for docking and maneuvering.

For sailing the design may be equipped with an optional genoa and spinnaker. Roller furling, a boom vang and boat trailers for both versions are also optional.

Variants
Cape Cod Mercury 15 FK
Cape Cod Mercury 15 CB
The boat displaces .

See also
List of sailing boat types

References

External links

Official website

Keelboats
Dinghies
1940s sailboat type designs
Sailing yachts
Trailer sailers
Sailboat type designs by Sparkman and Stephens
Sailboat types built by Cape Cod Shipbuilding